EDISON also known as 陳冠希EDISON was released on November 30, 2000 by Hong Kong pop singer-actor Edison Chen.

Background
The song "Extremely Love Myself" was composed by the Hong Kong legend Leslie Cheung (Edison's idol) 2 years before Cheung died. "Heroes" is the English version of the song 要來便來 (Yin Lai Bin Lai) as the ending song for his movie Gen Y Cops.

Track listing
"Heroes" (English version of "要来便来")
欠了你的愛" (Mandarin Version of "極愛自己") 
"左上右落" Right Off The Left
"甜品" Desert
"要來便來" To Come Will Come (Gen Y Cops Original Soundtrack)
"你" You
"極愛自己" Loving Myself

2000 debut EPs
Edison Chen albums